Bothrostethus annulipes is a species of Coreidae family, subfamily Pseudophloeinae.

Distribution
This species can be found in Europe. It is non present in the Britain Islands.

Description

Body is black-brown. Connexivum is yellow spotted. The margin of the pronotum is finely denticulate. The humeral tooth is very obvious and curved to the outside. A black median notch is present on the front of the pronotum. The apex of the scutellum is clear, almost white. The tibias are yellow, darker towards the end.

This species is rather similar to Centrocoris spiniger, Centrocoris variegatus and Gonocerus insidiator.

Biology
These herbivore insects are trophically associated with leguminous plants. They mainly feed on Bromus species. Adult males have the unusual behaviour of feeding  on excrements.

Bibliography
 Moulet. 1995. Faune de France 81:150 - Identification W Palaearctic. - Bothrostethus annulipes 
 Dolling. 2006. In Aukema & Rieger Ed. -  Catalogue of Heteroptera of the Palaearctic Region 5:48
 Carl W. Schaefer, Paula Levin Mitchell - Food Plants of the Coreoidea (Hemiptera: Heteroptera) - Ann Entomol Soc Am (1983) 76 (4): 591–615.

References

External links 
 EOL
 Galerie-insecte

Hemiptera of Europe
Insects described in 1835
Pseudophloeinae